Chloroselas taposana is a butterfly in the family Lycaenidae. It is found in South Sudan.

References

Butterflies described in 1932
Butterflies of Africa
Endemic fauna of South Sudan
Chloroselas